The action of 30 October 1762 was a minor naval battle that was fought in the San Bernardino Strait off the coast off British occupied Manila in the Philippines between two Royal Navy ships and a Spanish ship; the 60 gun ship of the line HMS Panther under Captain Hyde Parker and the frigate HMS Argo under Richard King captured the heavily armed Spanish treasure galleon Santisima Trinidad.

Background
The Santisima Trinidad was a large ship constructed in 1750 at Manila of 60 guns and at the time the largest Manila galleon ever built. It was built for trade in the Pacific between the Spanish colonies. On 3 September 1762 the Trinidad departed the port of Cavite in the Spanish Philippines for Acapulco in Spanish Mexico with a cargo of valuables. However, due to contrary winds she never left the San Bernardino Strait until late September. On the night of 2–3 October a storm, possibly the tail end of a typhoon, brought down the fore and mainmasts and it was decided to turn back to Cavite under a jury rig. Unbeknownst to the ship's company, Spain and Great Britain were at war, as Spain had joined on the side of the French. As a result, a British and East India Company task force from India had thus captured Manila just as the Trinidad had left port.

Battle
As Trinidad passed through the San Bernardino Strait, HMS Panther and HMS Argo soon discovered her, and caught up with the Spanish ship. An action followed with Argo and Panther concentrating their fire on the masts and rigging. To Parker's amazement, the shots from Panther made very little impression on the galleon's hardwood hull. However, Trinidad was soon disabled and unable to manoeuvre, as the opening gun battle left its rigging a dismasted wreck. Despite this, Trinidad managed to put up stout resistance and continued for a total of 2 hours, but the ship was overcrowded for its size of nearly 800 crew, marines, civilians and its large cargo. It had in fact fewer than half the guns required to fight. Soon the Spanish commander realised that any further resistance was futile, and surrendered soon after. The human cost for the Spanish was 18 killed and 10 wounded and 750 captured, while British casualties were 35 killed and 37 wounded.

Aftermath
The cargo was valued at $1.5 million and the ship at $3 million. The galleon was eventually broken up for scrap.

See also
 Great Britain in the Seven Years War

References

Bibliography

Conflicts in 1762
Naval battles of the Seven Years' War
British invasion of Manila
Naval battles involving Great Britain
Naval battles involving the Philippines
Naval battles involving Spain
History of Cavite
Military history of the Philippines
Anglo-Spanish War (1762–1763)